The Mermaid Stakes was an American Thoroughbred horse race run annually at Sheepshead Bay Race Track in Sheepshead Bay, Brooklyn. An important event for three-year-old fillies, the race was run on dirt over a distance of one mile and one furlong until 1910 when it was set at one mile.

First run in 1880, there was no race from 1895 through 1901. During the twenty-four years the race was held, it was won by eight Champions of which four would be elected to the National Museum of Racing and Hall of Fame. The final running in 1910 was won by Lily Livingston's Amelia Jenks in a major upset over Ocean Bound, the undefeated 1909 American Champion Two-Year-Old Filly.

On June 11, 1908, the Republican controlled New York Legislature under Governor Charles Evans Hughes passed the Hart–Agnew anti-betting legislation with penalties allowing for fines and up to a year in prison. The owners of Sheepshead Bay Race Track, and other racing facilities in New York State, struggled to stay in business without betting. Racetrack operators had no choice but to drastically reduce the purse money being paid out which by 1909 saw the Mermaid Stakes offering a purse that was as little as one-third of what it had been in earlier years. Further restrictive legislation was passed by the New York Legislature in 1910 which deepened the financial crisis for track operators and led to a complete shut down of racing across the state during 1911 and 1912. When a Court ruling saw racing return in 1913 it was too late for the Sheepshead Bay horse racing facility and it never reopened.

Champions who won the Mermaid Stakes:
Miss Woodford (HoF)
Firenze (HoF)
Yorkville Belle
Beldemere
Beldame (HoF)
Perverse
Stamina
Maskette (HoF)

Records
Speed record:
 1:52 flat, 1 1/8 miles, Maskette (1909)

Most wins by a jockey:
 3 – Jim McLaughlin (1883, 1887, 1888)

Most wins by a trainer:
 4 – James G. Rowe Sr. (1883, 1889, 1890, 1909)

Most wins by an owner:
 2 – Dwyer Brothers Stable (1883, 1888)
 2 – August Belmont Jr.  (1889, 1990)
 2 – Harry Payne Whitney (1906, 1908)

Winners

References

Flat horse races for three-year-old fillies
Discontinued horse races in New York City
Sheepshead Bay Race Track
Recurring sporting events established in 1880
Recurring events disestablished in 1910
1880 establishments in New York (state)
1910 disestablishments in New York (state)